Igembe South Constituency is an electoral constituency in Kenya. It is one of nine constituencies of Meru County. The constituency was established for the 1988 elections. It was known as Igembe Constituency before the 2007 elections.

It was one of four constituencies of the former Meru North District.
Constituency Website, www.igembesouth.co.ke

Members of Parliament

Locations and wards

References 

Constituencies in Meru County
Constituencies in Eastern Province (Kenya)
1988 establishments in Kenya
Constituencies established in 1988